Alexander Ernest Donnelly, known as Alex Donnelly (died 9 May 1958), was a nationalist politician and solicitor in Ireland.

Donnelly studied at the Christian Brothers School in Omagh and the Royal University of Ireland.  He was elected to Tyrone County Council in 1914, holding his seat until 1951, holding the post of council Chairman from 1920 to 1924.  He was also a member of Omagh Urban District Council.  In 1916, he was a founder member of Sinn Féin in the county, alongside Cahir Healy, James McHugh and Basil McGuckin.

At the 1925 Northern Ireland general election, Donnelly was elected for the Nationalist Party in Fermanagh and Tyrone.  He first took his seat in November 1927.  His seat was abolished in 1929, and he was instead elected for West Tyrone.  He held this seat until he retired in 1949.

References

Year of birth missing
1958 deaths
Alumni of the Royal University of Ireland
Members of the House of Commons of Northern Ireland 1925–1929
Members of the House of Commons of Northern Ireland 1929–1933
Members of the House of Commons of Northern Ireland 1933–1938
Members of the House of Commons of Northern Ireland 1938–1945
Members of the House of Commons of Northern Ireland 1945–1949
Nationalist Party (Ireland) members of the House of Commons of Northern Ireland
Solicitors from Northern Ireland
Early Sinn Féin politicians
Members of the House of Commons of Northern Ireland for Fermanagh and Tyrone
Members of the House of Commons of Northern Ireland for County Tyrone constituencies
Sinn Féin councillors in Northern Ireland
Members of Tyrone County Council